Denise June Langford (born 31 December 1953) is an Australian former competitive swimmer. She swam in the 1968 Summer Olympics and 1970 British Commonwealth Games. Langford is the mother of Australian netball player Kimberlee Green.

References
 ; retrieved 5 December 2015

See also
 List of Commonwealth Games medallists in swimming (women)

1953 births
Living people
Sportswomen from New South Wales
Australian female freestyle swimmers
Australian female medley swimmers
Olympic swimmers of Australia
Swimmers at the 1968 Summer Olympics
Swimmers at the 1970 British Commonwealth Games
Commonwealth Games gold medallists for Australia
Commonwealth Games silver medallists for Australia
Swimmers from Sydney
Commonwealth Games medallists in swimming
20th-century Australian women
Medallists at the 1970 British Commonwealth Games